Kevya King is the founder of Earth Essentials and is the ceo of the Royal Highness Cannabis Boutique in Palm Desert, California.

See also 

 Cannabis
 Medical cannabis

References 

Living people
Year of birth missing (living people)